Black Love may refer to:

Film and television 
 Black Love, a 1971 American pornographic film directed by Herschell Gordon Lewis
 #BlackLove (2015 TV series), an American series broadcast by FYI
 Black Love (2017 TV series), an American docuseries

Music 
 Black Love (The Afghan Whigs album), a 1996 album
 Black Love (Carlos Garnett album), a 1974 album, and its title track